The broadcasts of the Olympic Games produced by CBS Sports was shown on the CBS television network in the United States. The network's last Olympics broadcast was the 1998 Winter Games in Nagano, Japan.

History

1960s coverage
The first live telecast of the Olympics on American television was from the 1960 Winter Olympics in Squaw Valley, California (now, Olympic Valley). CBS paid $50,000 to obtain the broadcast rights. Walter Cronkite hosted the game telecasts, anchoring on-site from Squaw Valley. With Squaw Valley connected to the network lines, some events were broadcast live while the remainder of the network's coverage was of events shown on the same day they took place. During the games, officials asked Tony Verna, one of the members of the production staff, if it could use its videotape equipment to determine whether or not a slalom skier missed a gate. Verna then returned to CBS headquarters in New York City and developed the first instant replay system, which debuted at the Army–Navy football game in 1963. The event in Squaw Valley was the last time CBS would carry a Winter Olympics until 1992.

Later that year, CBS aired the 1960 Summer Olympics from Rome, the only time that CBS has ever televised a Summer Games event. The network carried about 20 hours of coverage of such events as track and field and swimming. Because communications satellites, which would have provided direct transmissions between the United States and Italy, were not yet available, production staff members fed footage from Rome to London, re-recorded it on tape there, and then the tapes were flown to CBS headquarters in New York (or a mobile unit parked at Idelwild Airport in New York, to lessen time that transporting videotapes into the city would take) for later telecast.

Despite this, at least some of the events, especially those held in the morning and early-afternoon (local time in Rome), actually aired in the United States the same day they took place (often during a half-hour late-night show that aired from 11:15 to 11:45 p.m. Eastern Time). Jim McKay, then a relatively unknown radio and television personality, was the host, anchoring not from Rome, but from the CBS studios in New York City.

1990s coverage
Although CBS bid on the rights to several Olympics in the 1970s and 1980s, the network was outbid by rivals, NBC and ABC. When the 1990s approached, CBS won the rights to three consecutive Winter Games: 1992, 1994 and 1998.

The network provided some live coverage of the 1992 Games in Albertville, France on weekend mornings and afternoons (and on the last Friday morning (Eastern Time) of the Games to show live the men's ice hockey semifinal between the United States and Unified Team, but most of the events (and all of the prime time coverage) were broadcast by CBS on tape delay, owing to the time difference between the United States and Europe. A similar format was used two years later in 1994 when the Winter Games adopted a new schedule, midway between the four-year Summer Games cycle, instead of in the same year as the Summer Olympics.

The 1994 Games in Lillehammer, Norway saw the highest nighttime ratings in the history of American Olympic telecasts, as a result of the scandal in which associates of figure skater Tonya Harding attacked Nancy Kerrigan and the media frenzy that followed. The short program in women's figure skating, which aired on February 23 is, the sixth-highest rated prime time television program in American history. It had a rating of 48.5 and a share of 64 (meaning 48.5% of all television sets in the U.S. and 64% of all television sets turned on were tuned in to CBS). The long program two days later had a rating of 44.1 and another 64 share; it ranks 32nd. Both the short and long programs were shown on tape delay during prime time about six or so hours after the events had taken place.

Also contributing to the huge ratings in 1994 were a surprise gold medal by American skier Tommy Moe, as well as Dan Jansen's speed skating gold medal win, and, on the final morning (Eastern Time) of the Games, a dramatic championship game in men's hockey between Sweden and Canada, won by Sweden in a shootout. When the construction of the Lysgårdsbakken jumping hills started in 1992, the hills had to be moved some meters north so that television broadcasters (including CBS) could get the best pictures available from their pre-chosen location.

The affiliation switches that followed the 1994 games resulted in several CBS affiliates losing their network affiliation to Fox and NBC, the latter of which began broadcasting the Winter Olympics in 2002. The affiliation deal between CBS and Westinghouse Broadcasting resulted in WBAL-TV, WHDH and WCAU switching to NBC in 1995, one year before those stations aired the 1996 games.

The 1998 Winter Games in Nagano, Japan did feature some live prime time coverage in the Eastern and Central Time Zones (the Opening Ceremony and some alpine skiing events), since these events were being held in the morning local time in Japan, which corresponded to the prime time slot in the U.S. Much of the men's and women's hockey action was held in the early afternoon (during late night in the Eastern Time Zone, allowing again for live broadcasts at 12:30 a.m. Eastern Time), however figure skating was shown on delay about 20 hours after the competitions took place so they could air in prime time.

Each telecast had a different prime time host(s): Paula Zahn and Tim McCarver in 1992, Greg Gumbel in 1994, and Jim Nantz in 1998. CBS' theme music for their Olympic coverage was composed by Tamara Kline.

In 2011, CBS Sports president Sean McManus said the option to bid for the 2014 Winter Olympics or 2016 Olympics "is not a priority of ours right now."

Hours of coverage

Commentators

See also
ABC Olympic broadcasts
NBC Olympic broadcasts 
TNT Olympic broadcasts
Olympics on television

Notes

External links
CBSSports.com - Olympics
TV Theme - Olympics, Lillehammer Winter Games 1994 (CBS).wav
Olympic Commentators by Event History
The World Comes Together in Your Living Room: The Olympics on TV
CBS, Time Warner execs discuss Olympics TV bid
InBaseline
The 1992 Winter Olympics
1994 Olympic Winter Games
Olympic Winter Games XVIII
Logos of Olympic Broadcasters - Part 2: 1960s
Logos of Olympic Broadcasters - Part 5: 1990s

CBS Sports
CBS original programming
CBS
Black-and-white American television shows
1992 American television series debuts
1998 American television series endings
1960 American television series debuts
1960 American television series endings